Battle of the Cerna Bend may refer to:
 Battle of the Crna Bend (1916)
 Battle of the Crna Bend (1917)